Piel de Ángel (Skin of Angel) is the thirteenth album from Mexican pop music singer and actress Lucero. It was released in 1997.

For this album, the singer choose to work with Italian producers Claudio Guidetti and Maurizio Fabrizio to achieve a new sound on her music, since she had already three back to back ballad albums written and produced by Spanish songwriter Rafael Pérez-Botija.

Piel de Ángel was released just after Lucero's wedding with Manuel Mijares (one of the highest rated events in Mexico history), and was another successful recording for her, selling 600,000 copies only in her native country; rarely certify three gold records for their high sales.

Gerardo Flores wrote seven out of eleven tracks included on the project, including an adaptation of the "Il Postino" score, written by Luis Bacalov, by Lucero's request, since her mother was a big fan of the movie.

As usual for a first single for the singer albums, "Tácticas de Guerra" (War Tactics) and hit the No. 1 spot in Mexico and also the No. 13 on the Billboard Hot Latin Tracks chart.

The track "Si Tú Llegaras a Amarme" (If You Would Love Me) is the result of a contest in México for the soap opera "Lazos de Amor" (also starring Lucero).

"Quiero" (I Want) was released as second single reaching No. 8 in Mexico. The third single "Toda la Noche" (All Night Long) had a first video directed by Adolfo Pérez Butrón, the photographer behind almost every cover of the artist albums.

On her second live album Lucero En Vivo Auditorio Nacional the track "Historias de Amores" (Love Stories) and the single "Tácticas de Guerra" appears on the setlist.

Track listing
The album is composed by 11 songs, all of them were arranged and produced by different composers.

Singles

Chart performance
This was the 7th album of Lucero that entered to the list of Billboard and the last album of pop music to do so, until after 13 years later she entered with Indispensable. The album stayed in the chart of the Latin Pop Albums for 9 weeks, peaking #12; and it stayed in the Top Latin Albums for 13 weeks, peaking at No. 28.

Credits

Personnel
 Production: Claudio Guidetti and Maurizio Fabrizio from Destino SRL
 Recorded at: Studio L’isola (Milan, Italy) by Bruno Malasoma; Soundabout Studio (LA) by Claudio Guidetti and Rodolfo Vazquez.
 Strings recording: Olympic Studios (London) by Pete Lewis and Adam Brown
 Mixing: Studio L’isola by Bruno Melasoma and Claudio Guidetti
 Mastering: Nautilus (Milan) by Antonio Baglio
 Executive producer: Tina Galindo
 Production coordinator: Sylvia Cantarell
 Photography: Adolfo Pérez Butrón
 Wardrobe: Beatriz Calles, Sarah Bustani and Keko
 Graphic design: Varela design.

Musicians
 Drums: Elio Rivagli
 Bass: Flavio Scopaz
 Guitars, piano and keyboards: Claudio Guidetti and Maurizio Fabrizio
 Electric guitar: Andrea Braido
 Sax: Emanuele Cisi
 Backing vocals: Emanuela Cortesi, Monica Magnani, Claudio Guidetti and Maurizio Fabrizio
 Violin: Lucio Fabbri, Russel Gilbert and Mario de Monte
 Strings arrangement: Maurizio Fabrizio

References

1997 albums
Lucero (entertainer) albums